Silinder Pardesi is a Bhangra singer-songwriter, lyricist, and composer from Coventry, West Midlands, England. He is the founder and lead singer of the highly acclaimed British Asian Bhangra band 'The Pardesi Music Machine'. In 1994 Silinder Pardesi moved onto pastures new and began his solo career. Over the past 30 years Silinder Pardesi has released over twenty albums and collaborated with an array of artists including Rishi Rich and Neeru Bajwa.

Silinder Pardesi is also a graduate from Aston University, Birmingham, England, and holds a bachelor's degree with honours in Electrical and Electronic Engineering.

The Pardesi Music Machine
Silinder Pardesi started his singing career at a very young age, with encouragement from his family and friends. Singing in Sikh temples and being influenced by his idol Mohammed Rafi, he gained confidence and widened his singing and musical knowledge.

The Pardesi Music Machine was formed by Silinder Pardesi during the early 1980s. The band always maintained its impeccable standards of high quality music performed by talented musicians of high calibre. The powerful sound of Pardesi catapulted them to the status of being one of the best live Asian music bands in the industry extremely popular with Asian weddings, mela's, and world music festivals. The Pardesi Music Machine are renowned for performing a fusion of Punjabi and Hindi music with other musical influences such as reggae, dance, RnB, and rock.

In 1986 the Pardesi Music Machine claimed the much prestigious Asian Song Contest Award which secured them a recording contract with Oriental Star Agencies. This encouraged them to record and release their first religious album with all proceeds being donated to charity. Soon after they recorded their first Bhangra album 'Nashay Diye Band Botlay'. 1988 saw a landmark in the UK Asian music industry with the release of an album, which proved to be one of the biggest selling albums in Bhangra music titled 'Pump Up The Bhangra'. The album was highly acclaimed worldwide and sold over 25,000 copies.

‘Pump up the Bhangra' set the trend for a new wave of Bhangra music, seeing the first use of samplers, sequences and remixing.  The album captured the imagination of the Asian youth with its insistent westernised beats and traditional eastern melodies. The album is still regarded as one of the most innovative and pioneering albums to date reaching number 1 chart status across Europe, Canada and the US. Its successor album 'Shake Yer Pants' was released by Oriental Star Agencies in 1990 and also achieved immense worldwide success selling over 30,000 copies. Both albums received Gold Disc awards at the annual UK Asian Pop and Media Awards.

1990 saw the Pardesi Music Machine perform live on the eve of the football World Cup final in Italy. The Pardesi Music machine have performed at world music festivals in Canada, US, France, Belgium, Germany, Sweden, Switzerland and the Netherlands where they have featured alongside leading pop acts such as Womack & Womack, Neneh Cherry, Carlos Santana, Stevie Wonder and many others.

The Pardesi Music Machine was the first Bhangra band to perform at the famous Glastonbury music festival in 1994 alongside acts including Blur, Björk, and Oasis. 1994 saw the band play alongside the late great Nusrat Fateh Ali Khan at the Edinburgh music festival.

Career
In 1994 Silinder Pardesi decided to move onto pastures new and pursue his solo career. Since embarking on his solo career, Silinder Pardesi has released seventeen highly acclaimed solo albums and one greatest hits album. In addition to recording solo Bhangra albums, Silinder Pardesi recorded the albums Bollywood Seduction 1 and Bollywood Seduction 2 as tribute albums for his childhood musical idol Mohammed Rafi. In 1995 Silinder Pardesi received a Gold Disc award at the UK Asian Pop and Dance Awards, Birmingham, England in recognition of outstanding sales for the album Bollywood Seduction 1. Following the success of the Bollywood Seduction series, in 2006 Silinder Pardesi performed with The City of Birmingham Symphony Orchestra (CBSO) 60-piece orchestra in 'A Tribute to Mohammed Rafi' concert at the Symphony Hall, Birmingham, West Midlands, England.

Silinder Pardesi's solo albums have included music production and collaborations with many artists including Sukshinder Shinda, Kam Frantic, Dr Zeus, and Tarli Digital.

Silinder Pardesi has performed around the world and enjoyed the excitement of playing to crowds of various nationalities and races around the world. On 9 September 1997, the city of Moscow celebrated its 850th anniversary in the 'Red Square' with an estimated audience of 500,000 people. Silinder Pardesi represented Asian music with a live performance alongside other famous artists such as the legendary Luciano Pavarotti.

Music from Silinder Pardesi's albums has received air play on a number of UK Radio Stations including the BBC Asian Network, and Television broadcasts including: 'The Clothes Show', 'Motormouth', 'DEF II' and even used as the title music to BBC's 'Ipso Facto'. Together with his live band Silinder Pardesi has recorded live sessions for BBC's "Network East" and "What's that Noise". Silinder Pardesi's album covers have also been featured in many films including the British comedy 'Bend It Like Beckham', directed by Gurinder Chadha and starred Keira Knightley.

In 2006 Silinder Pardesi was head hunted to join one India's top Bollywood record companies Tips Music (India) to produce his future albums and videos. The blockbuster album 'Hey Soniye' had its first video single feature the world famous Bollywood actress Neeru Bajwa, Rishi Rich, Juggy D and Veronica Mehta. The album's title tracks 'Hey Soniye' and 'Mahi Vey' were produced by Rishi Rich.

In December 2011 after two years in the making, Silinder Pardesi released a Sikh religious Shabad Gurbani album entitled 'Ek Onkar' (God is One).

Awards and recognition
1986 – Asian Song Contest Award (Oriental Star Agencies)

1989 – Pump Up The Bhangra – Best Album, Gold Disc for Outstanding Sales, and Best Band Awards (UK Asian Pop and Media Awards)

1991 – The Pardesi Music Machine – Best Band (UK Asian Pop and Media Awards)

1992 – Shake Yer Pants – Best Album, Gold Disc for Outstanding Sales, and Best Single -Balbeero Bhabi (UK Asian Pop and Media Awards)

1995 – Bollywood Seduction – Gold Disc for Outstanding Sales Achievement (UK Asian Pop and Dance Awards)

1999 – Achievement in Asian Music Award (Awarded by the High Commissioner for India in the UK, Mr Lalit Mann)

2009 – Punjabi Cultural Award – Contribution to the promotion of Punjabi culture in Britain through music (The Punjabis in Britain All Parliamentary Group, Westminster, London)

Discography

Religious

References

External links 
 Silinder Pardesi Official Site
 BBC Music
 BBC Asian Network
 Twitter
 Facebook
 YouTube
 Google+

Bhangra (music) musicians
English Sikhs
Living people
Punjabi singers
Desi musicians
Indian male singers
Musicians from Birmingham, West Midlands
English people of Indian descent
Musicians from London
People from Southall
Year of birth missing (living people)